Entores Ltd v Miles Far East Corporation [1955] EWCA Civ 3 is a landmark English Court of Appeal decision in contract law on the moment of acceptance of a contract over telex. Denning LJ found that the regular postal rule did not apply for instantaneous means of communications such as a telex. Instead, acceptance occurs when and where the message of acceptance is received.

Facts
Entores was a London-based trading company that sent an offer by telex for the purchase of copper cathodes from a company based in Amsterdam. The Dutch company sent an acceptance by telex. The contract was not fulfilled and so Entores attempted to sue the owner of the Dutch company for damages. The controlling company, Entores, was based in the UK and under English law Entores could only bring the action in the UK (serve notice of writ outside the jurisdiction) if it could prove that the contract was formed within the jurisdiction, i.e. in London rather than Amsterdam.

Judgment
Denning LJ, delivered the leading judgment. He said that the postal rule could not apply to instantaneous communications, such as telephone or telex: if a phoneline "went dead" just before the offeree said "yes", it would be absurd to assume that the contract was formed - the parties would have to call each other back. The same applied to telex. Since the contract was therefore only formed when and where the telex was received, the place of formation was London.

See also

 Brinkibon Ltd v Stahag Stahl und Stahlwarenhandelsgesellschaft mbH
 The Brimnes

Notes

English agreement case law
Lord Denning cases
1955 in British law
Court of Appeal (England and Wales) cases
1955 in case law
Telecommunications law